The Stade Pierre-Mauroy, also known as the Decathlon Arena – Stade Pierre-Mauroy for sponsorship reasons, is a multi-use retractable roof stadium in Villeneuve-d'Ascq (Métropole Européenne de Lille), France, that opened in August 2012. It has a seating capacity of 50,186 and is the home stadium of Lille OSC. Initially named Grand Stade Lille Métropole, the stadium was renamed on 21 June 2013, just after the death of the former Mayor of Lille and former Prime Minister of France Pierre Mauroy (1928–2013).

History

Before the Grand Stade
In 1975, Lille OSC began playing at the Stade Grimonprez-Jooris, a 21,128-seat facility. When the club began to play European Competitions, the venue did not match UEFA standards, prompting the club to play its UEFA Champions League games at the Stade Félix-Bollaert, home of rival RC Lens, in 2001. Plans were soon made to build a new stadium which would match UEFA demands, but the project was postponed and finally cancelled due to struggle with preservationists who stated that the location chosen for the new stadium was too close to the 17th Century Citadel.

The club, left without a place to play, moved to the Stadium Nord which was smaller than Grimonprez-Jooris (18,154 seats) and did not fulfill UEFA demands. This situation forced the team, who had qualified for 2005–06 UEFA Champions League, to play at the Stade de France for its European matches. This solution was abandoned after two young LOSC fans lost their lives when they got hit by an incoming train after a game against Olympique Lyonnais.

New administration, new project
While LOSC was struggling with its stadium problems, the administrative landscape of the Lille area changed. The city was now included in a vast association with its enclosed neighbours, forming the Urban Community of Lille Métropole. The new administration, now in charge of the whole area, decided to launch a new stadium project. On 5 December 2006, an industrial bid for a 50,000-seat multi-purpose stadium, able to receive sport competitions, cultural shows and hold seminars, was launched.  The following January, three worldwide construction companies answered the call, each one with ambitious projects:

 Eiffage: a 50,000-seat capacity multi-purpose stadium, Meeting HQE standards with a retractable roof. The stadium has also a particularity: it can become a fully functional arena of 30,000 seats in only one hour: the Boite à spectacle.
 Bouygues: The project proposed by the company was highly effective in energy saving. The structure was geothermic and most of its power was produced by Renewable energy. The stadium would have a 50,127-seat capacity.
 Vinci: The project proposed by Vinci was the largest of the competition with a 50,921-seat capacity and a retractable roof. It would have been powered by 8000 m2 of Solar panels

In February 2008, Eiffage was selected during a general meeting to build the stadium. The contract was officially signed between the two parties on October of the same year. Eiffage was given 45 months to complete the project

Stadium construction
On 10 July 2009, Eiffage received the building permit and authorisation to start preparatory works for the construction at the Borne de l'Espoir location in Villeneuve-d'Ascq. In December 2009, the final two cities of the Lille Métropole who had yet to sign the building permit joined the project and gave their authorisation. In February 2010, France officially became a candidate to organize the UEFA Euro 2016. The Grand Stade become the symbol of the candidature, boosting its public support. In March 2010, construction of access infrastructure (Subway, Highway, parking lots) began followed one week after by the beginning of the construction of the arena itself. On 28 May 2010, France was officially chosen to organize the Euro 2016. Martine Aubry, who succeeded Pierre Mauroy at the head of LCMU and a big supporter of LOSC and the Grand Stade, expressed her wish to see the Grand Stade given a prominent amount of competition for the upcoming competition. Construction accelerated, with the first brick laid by the Eiffage CEO in September 2010. In 2011, the structure supporting the roof was put in place and constructions of the northern stand was completed by the end of that year. In 2012, the retractable roof, constructed in one piece, was successfully put in place in one day. Despite some legal delays, the stadium was delivered on schedule during the summer of 2012, in time for the 2012–13 LOSC season.

Structure, facilities and uses

Cost and financing

The total cost of the Eiffage project was €618 million, including €282 million for the stadium, €42 million for additional development such as parking, hotels, and restaurants, and €96 million to ensure seismic standards were met.  This latter requirement was introduced in 2011, following a new law passed in the wake of the massive Japan earthquake and tsunami.  The cost was spread between the city of Lille (€24.7 million annually for 31 years), the LOSC (€7.5 million annually) and the Nord-Pas-de-Calais regional council (€45 million).

The cost of the project spurred considerable controversy. On one hand, Martine Aubry and her First Deputy Pierre de Saintignon, in charge of the project, highlighted the Grand Stade as "a splendid ambassador of the technologies of our region, and a great tool of attractivity".  On the other hand, opponents pointed to a lack of long term viability, since part of the public investments were bound to sporting events, whose results are of random nature. This could lead to some new kind of toxic loans.

Multiple floor features
Stade Pierre-Mauroy has two floors or main levels. The full stadium level or Grand Stade reaches a height of 31 m (101 feet) and has a total capacity of 50,186 seats including 4,965 business seats, 1,842 luxury-box seats, 448 protocol seats and 326 reserved for the press.

The stadium has also a peculiarity: half of the Grand Stade field is situated on hydraulics lift and massive tracks that raise and slide it above the other half of the field in three hours. This creates a second lower-level floor plan and surrounding seats called Boîte à Spectacles, where basketball, tennis or music shows can take place. The Boîte à Spectacles can be configured to have a variable capacity, from 6,900 to 30,000 seats.

In addition, Stade Pierre-Mauroy has a retractable roof which opens and shuts in 15 minutes. The stadium is also recognised as a HQE Building with solar panels and two windmills to provide as electrical supply. The stadium is fully accessible by metro stations and road and includes 7,000 parking spaces.

Tenants and sports uses
The Grand Stade received a five-star UEFA ranking. It is expected to significantly increase the revenue streams of Lille OSC, its tenant club.

The stadium hosted France national football team and France national rugby union team as well as some games of UEFA Euro 2016 and many Top 14 matches. The stadium hosted its first rugby union test match on 17 November 2012 during the 2012 Autumn Internationals, when France defeated Argentina 39–22. It has been chosen to be one of the nine venues selected for France's hosting of the 2023 Rugby World Cup. The 30,000-seat arena hosted EuroBasket 2015, Davis Cup, 2017 World Men's Handball Championship and will host handball and basketball tournaments at the 2024 Olympic Games.

The record attendance for a sports game stands at 49,712 spectators, who witnessed Lille's 5–1 win over PSG in 2019.

EuroBasket 2015 matches

The knock-out phase of EuroBasket 2015 was held at the Stade Pierre-Mauroy from 12 to 20 September 2015, including the Final. The indoor configuration of the stadium has a capacity of 27,000.

UEFA Euro 2016 matches

The stadium was one of the venues of the UEFA Euro 2016, and held the following matches:

2023 Rugby World Cup matches

Concerts

References

External links

 Stade Pierre-Mauroy

Football venues in France
Basketball venues in France
Tennis venues in France
Retractable-roof stadiums in Europe
Buildings and structures in Villeneuve-d'Ascq
Sports venues completed in 2012
Sports venues in Nord (French department)
UEFA Euro 2016 stadiums
Venues of the 2024 Summer Olympics
Olympic handball venues
Sports venues in Lille
2018 Davis Cup
2017 Davis Cup
21st-century architecture in France